Iron Fist is the fifth studio album by British rock band Motörhead, released in April 1982 by Bronze Records. It was the final album of the classic Three Amigos lineup of Lemmy Kilmister, "Fast" Eddie Clarke, and Phil "Philthy Animal" Taylor. The album peaked at No. 6 on the UK album charts. It was preceded by the release of the title track "Iron Fist" as a single on 3 April, which peaked in the UK singles chart at No. 29.

Recording
As with 1980's Ace of Spades, recording commenced with producer Vic Maile at his Jackson's Studio in Rickmansworth in 1981. Motorhead was enjoying their greatest commercial success at the time, having had their live album No Sleep 'til Hammersmith debut at No. 1 on the UK charts. A break in recording for the band to play some November and December dates with Tank was followed by Clarke producing Tank's debut album with help from Will Reid Dick. Soon after, Maile left the Motörhead project, and there are conflicting explanations as to why. One is that Clarke was unhappy with the Maile produced sessions and decided that the album should be recorded themselves, although Lemmy lamented at the time that:

However, in the Motörhead documentary The Guts and the Glory, Clarke insists that drummer Phil "Philthy Animal" Taylor refused to work with the producer after Maile got him an unsatisfactory drum sound, stating:

In the same film Lemmy states:

The album was recorded during the best part of late January and February 1982 at Morgan Studios and Ramport Studios in London, with Clarke producing and Dick engineering. Struggling to think of a name for the title track for the album, Lemmy remembered the time the band had performed live under the name Iron Fist and the Hordes from Hell for contractual reasons (a subsequent album What's Words Worth? was released of that event), and decided this was an apt name for this project. The name was eventually shortened to simply Iron Fist.

Release
A promotional film was made of the band dressed in studded leather armour and wielding broadswords, described by Lemmy as "all dressed up as idiots, prancing about in a wood in South Mimms as opposed to prancing about in South Mimms dressed as cowboy idiots", with Clarke adding that they looked "like a bunch of fairies prancing about with armour on... It's very hard not to."
The band undertook a UK tour from 17 March to 12 April with support from Tank. This was to be the first tour to drop the bomber lighting rig, with Lemmy feeling that they had "to do something new sooner or later" despite it being "the best show I've ever seen in my life". The rig was replaced by a gigantic iron fist that was supposed to unfold its hand but, as Lemmy explained to Uncut's John Robinson in 2015, it malfunctioned and made a "rude gesture" to the crowd. The band continued touring to promote the album, visiting North America in May and June, Japan at the end of June, and, after some summer festival appearances, mainland Europe in October and November.

The first date of the North American tour, 12 May at C.N.E. Coliseum (now Ricoh Coliseum) in Toronto, was filmed and subsequently released on video as Live in Toronto and later as the bonus disc of the deluxe edition of the CD. In his 2002 autobiography White Line Fever, Lemmy recalls that at the Toronto show:

Promotion for the album went as far as the May 1982 edition of Rennbahn Express, an Austrian magazine, which included a free flexidisc with excerpts from "Iron Fist", "Sex and Outrage", "Don't Let 'em Grind You Down", and "Loser". Lemmy is interviewed by Robert Reumann in English and is overdubbed with a German translation. The release of the album prompted Bronze/Mercury in Canada to issue The Complete Motörhead Kit, which featured a limited-edition 12-inch vinyl containing "Iron Fist", "Too Late, Too Late", "Remember Me, I'm Gone", "Ace of Spades" and "Motörhead" (from the No Sleep 'til Hammersmith album), plus a tour programme, a tour poster, and an embroidered patch of the band's logo.

"Fast" Eddie's departure
After the second date on 14 May at New York's Palladium, Clarke left the band, his replacement being former Thin Lizzy guitarist Brian Robertson with the tour recommencing a week later on 21 May in Detroit. Bad feelings between Kilmister and Clarke had been simmering for a while, but the breaking point came when Lemmy decided to record a cover of the Tammy Wynette country classic "Stand By Your Man" with Wendy O' Williams and the Plasmatics. Asked to play on the single, Clarke quit the band. Lemmy reflected on the guitarist's departure in his 2002 memoir:

Lemmy reiterated in 2000 that Iron Fist was:

Clarke maintains in The Guts and the Glory:

Critical reception

AllMusic enthuses Iron Fist is "a fine Motörhead album, and there's not much at all to complain about here", but concedes "Clarke's production is a bit sterile" while lauding "several standout songs... amid a strong selection overall". Amazon.com calls the album "a twelve-fingered mutation of an album with a clutch of gem-studded tracks..."

Track listing

Standard edition

Castle Communications 1996 CD reissue bonus tracks

Sanctuary Records 2005 2-CD deluxe edition
Disc one includes the original album without bonus tracks. Track B1 is the B-side of the "Iron Fist" single.Tracks B2–B15 is the band's performance at the Maple Leaf Gardens, Toronto, Canada, on 12 May 1982.

 There is discrepancy about the live recording location, as the original VHS of the show says the "C.N.E. Colosseum, Toronto" and the 2005 deluxe booklet says "Maple Leaf Gardens, Toronto".

40th Anniversary Edition (23 September 2022)

Personnel
Per the album's liner notes.
 Lemmy – vocals, bass guitar
 "Fast" Eddie Clarke – guitars
 Phil "Philthy Animal" Taylor – drums

Production
Will "Evil Red Neck" Reid – producer
"Fast" Eddie Clarke – producer
Charles Harrowell – engineer
Chaz Harrowell – mixing
Martin Poole – album design
Alan Ballard – photography
Joe Petagno – Snaggletooth

2005 deluxe edition remaster
Giovanni Scatola – mastering
 Steve Hammonds – release coordination
 Jon Richards – release coordination
Malcolm Dome – sleeve notes
Mick Stevenson – project consultant, photos and archive memorabilia
Curt Evans – 2005 cover design

Charts

Certifications

Release history

References

Motörhead albums
1982 albums
Mercury Records albums
Bronze Records albums
Albums recorded at Morgan Sound Studios